David Miklavčič (born 29 January 1983) is a Slovenian handball player for RK Gorenje Velenje and the Slovenian national team.

He competed at the 2016 European Men's Handball Championship.

References

 

1983 births
Living people
Slovenian male handball players
Handball players from Ljubljana
RK Zagreb players
Expatriate handball players
Slovenian expatriate sportspeople in Croatia
Olympic handball players of Slovenia
Handball players at the 2016 Summer Olympics